The name Lola has been used for seventeen tropical cyclones worldwide, fifteen in the Western Pacific Ocean, one in the South Pacific Ocean, and one in the South-West Indian Ocean.

In the Western Pacific.
 Typhoon Lola (1953) (T5305)
 Typhoon Lola (1957) (T5721)
 Typhoon Lola (1960) (T6023, 48W) – struck the Philippines.
 Typhoon Lola (1963) (T6319, 36W)
 Tropical Storm Lola (1966) (T6605, 05W) – struck Hong Kong.
 Typhoon Lola (1968) (T6824, 29W)
 Typhoon Lola (1972) (T7202, 03W)
 Typhoon Lola (1975) (T7501, 01W, Auring) – struck the Philippines.
 Typhoon Lola (1978) (T7821, 22W) – struck the Philippines.
 Typhoon Lola (1979) (T7913, 16W)
 Tropical Storm Lola (1982) (T8220, 21W)
 Typhoon Lola (1986) (T8603, 03W)
 Tropical Storm Ken-Lola (1989) (T8912, 13W14W) – one storm with two names, operationally thought to have been separate due to difficulties in tracking poorly organized systems; hit eastern China.
 Tropical Storm Lola (1990) (T9024, 26W) –  struck Vietnam.
 Typhoon Lola (1993) (T9326, 35W, Monang) – struck the Philippines and Vietnam.

In the South Pacific:
 Tropical Cyclone Lola (2005)

In the South-West Indian:
 Moderate Tropical Storm Lola (2008)

Pacific typhoon set index articles
South-West Indian Ocean cyclone set index articles
South Pacific cyclone set index articles